Spanbauer is a surname. Notable people with the surname include:

Richard Spanbauer (born 1946), American politician
Tom Spanbauer (born 1946), American writer